West Avenue is a major road located in Quezon City within the Diliman area of northeastern Metro Manila, Philippines. It runs north–south through the western edge of the barangay of West Triangle. The street is located in Quezon City's commercial-residential area, known for its restaurants, car shops, schools, and villages. It is also home to the old Delta theater located on the avenue's junction with Quezon Avenue. The avenue is a component of National Route 171 (N171) of the Philippine highway network.

Route description
West Avenue is a four-lane road located at the heart of Quezon City's residential-commercial district. It begins at its junction with EDSA west of North Avenue by the border with the central Diliman barangays of Bungad and Phil-Am. It heads south from this junction to cross Baler Street and Examiner Street towards the intersection with Del Monte Avenue. The avenue terminates at the junction with Quezon Avenue, west of Timog Avenue, in barangays West Triangle and Santa Cruz.

History
Previously called as Kanluran Avenue (Tagalog for west), the avenue forms the western boundary of the formerly proposed  Diliman Quadrangle within the former Diliman Estate also known as Hacienda de Tuason, purchased by the Philippine Commonwealth government in 1939 as the new capital to replace Manila. It was originally planned as the new city's Central Park housing the new national government buildings (the new presidential palace, Capitol Building, and Supreme Court complex) within the  elliptical site now known as the Quezon Memorial Circle. The quadrangle is bordered on the north by North Avenue, on the east by East Avenue, on the south by Timog (South) Avenue, and on the west by West Avenue. Designed by American city planner William E. Parsons and Harry Frost, in collaboration with engineer AD Williams and architects Juan Arellano and Louis Croft, the site was also to contain the  national exposition grounds opposite the corner of North Avenue and EDSA (now occupied by SM City North EDSA). The Diliman Quadrangle had been largely undeveloped for decades due to lack of funding. After several revisions, the government planners moved the city center to Novaliches due to its higher elevation. By 1976, the country's capital had been transferred back to Manila with only the Quezon Memorial built in the former capital site.

Intersections

References

Streets in Metro Manila
Quezon City
Restaurant districts and streets in the Philippines